Wang Hao (Chinese: 王皓; born 30 January 1993 in Fushun) is a Chinese football player who plays as a versatile defender, midfielder or striker for Kunshan.

Club career
Wang Hao would play for the Liaoning Whowin youth team and was promoted to train with the senior team during the 2011 league season. In the training sessions he would impress the Head coach Ma Lin who decided to promote him to the senior team. Wang Hao would officially start his professional football career when Liaoning Whowin included him in their 2012 Chinese Super League squad. He would eventually make his league debut for Liaoning on 17 March 2012 in a game against Guizhou Renhe, coming on as a substitute for Yang Xu in the 84th minute. Initially Wang started as forward within the team, however by the time he scored his first goal for the club on 11 May 2016 in a Chinese FA Cup game against Chengdu Qbao he had often been used as a utility player. His versatility would be highlighted on 3 March 2017 in a league game against Guizhou Hengfeng when the team's goalkeeper Shi Xiaotian was sent off in the 65th minute and Wang had to replace him for the remainder of the game that ended in a 1-1 draw. While Wang may have established himself as a regular within the team due to his versatility, the team was relegated at the end of the 2017 Chinese Super League. On 28 February 2020, Wang joined newly promoted Qingdao Huanghai for the start of the 2020 Chinese Super League.

Career statistics 
Statistics accurate as of match played 31 December 2020.

References

External links
 

1993 births
Living people
Chinese footballers
Footballers from Liaoning
Liaoning F.C. players
China League One players
Chinese Super League players
Association football forwards